Carl von Diebitsch (1819-1869) was a Prussian architect from Berlin active in Egypt and Prussia. He is notable for his role in the design of the Gezira Palace for Khedive Isma'il of Egypt.

Biography 
He traveled from 1842 to 1848 during his studies, in Rome, Sicily, North Africa, and Spain.

He designed the “,” inspired by the Alhambra which he studied while in Spain, for the Prussian participation in the 1867 Exposition Universelle in Paris.

Clients and works

References 

People from Prussia proper
19th-century architects

1819 births
1869 deaths